Jennie June may refer to:

 Jane Cunningham Croly (1829–1901), American author and journalist, better known by her pseudonym "Jennie June"
 Jennie June (autobiographer) (1874–?), one of the earliest transgender individuals to publish an autobiography in the United States
 Jennie June (sewing machine)

June, Jennie